Gerhard VII, Count of Holstein-Rendsburg (1404 – 24 July 1433 in Emmerich am Rhein) was Count of Holstein-Rendsburg and by claim also Duke of Schleswig, as Gerhard III.  He was the youngest son of Gerhard VI and his wife Elizabeth of Brunswick.

Life 
During the Danish-Hanseatic War, together with his elder brothers Henry IV and Adolf VIII, he fought on the side of the Hanseatic League against Denmark.  In 1428, he took part as commander of the city fleet in the attack of Flensburg and the bombardment of Copenhagen by the Hanseatic League.

In 1427, Gerhard VII and his brother Adolf VIII jointly took over the Duchy of Schleswig from their other fallen brother Henry IV (as Henry III duke of Schleswig).

On 2 June 1432, Gerhard VII married Agnes, the daughter of Margrave Bernard I of Baden.  On 15 January 1433, she fell from the stairs and went into labour.  She gave birth to healthy twins: Henry and Catherine.  It was fairly clear that she must have been pregnant on the day of her wedding, giving rise to rumours that the children might not have been Gerhard's.  To stop these rumours, Gerhard VII declared in Schleswig Cathedral that he was the father, and that he'd secretly slept with his future wife before the wedding, and that she'd been a virgin then.  Therefore, the children were his, and Henry would be capable of inheriting his possessions.  Adolf VIII supported this declaration.

Gerhard VII suffered from a lung disease.  In February 1433, his condition got worse, and his doctors could not help him.  Gerhard and Agnes then decided to travel to the spa in Baden-Baden.  While they were travelling, his condition got even worse and in Cologne, they decided to turn back.  Gerhard VII died on 24 July 1433, during the return journey and was buried in Emmerich am Rhein.

Adolf VIII refused to hand over Agnes's Wittum to her, and refused her access to his territory.  She had no choice, and returned to Baden.  The twins, Henry and Catherine, died young under suspicious circumstances.

Ancestry

External links 
  Gerhard III Entry in the 

Counts of Holstein
Dukes of Schleswig
House of Schauenburg
1404 births
1433 deaths
15th-century German people